Snezhinka is a ski jumping venue in Chaykovsky, Russia.

History 

First K40 hill was opened in 1980. K125 and K95 hills were opened in 2012. It hosted four FIS Ski jumping World Cup events for women in 2014, as well as several Summer Grand Prix events for women and men. There are also smaller K20, K40 and K65 hills.

Events

Men

Ladies

Mixed team 

Ski jumping venues in Russia
Sport in Perm Krai
Sports venues completed in 2012